Pine Brook may refer to:

Pine Brook, Minnesota
Pine Brook, Monmouth County, New Jersey
Pine Brook, Morris County, New Jersey
Pine Brook Hill, Colorado
Pine Brook Country Club
Pine Brook Covered Bridge
Camp Pine Brook, an historic Adirondack Great Camp on Upper Saranac Lake